KeyMe Locksmiths is a technology company that provides robotic kiosks for new key duplication, locksmith services, and an app for copying keys.

Company history
The company was founded by Greg Marsh in 2012, who developed the idea after he had a difficult experience getting his home's locks changed. Marsh now serves as the company's CEO. The company is based in New York City.

Key duplication
KeyMe's mobile app at one time, had users digitally scan their keys, the scans of which were then stored in the cloud. That data was then sent to physical kiosks, where new copies of those keys could be fabricated. Kiosks can also scan keys inserted directly into a scanning apparatus. The machinery in the kiosks can quickly reproduce brass keys, key fobs, and car keys both with and without transponders. The kiosks are located in various cities across the United States, generally alongside a box retailer, grocery store, or corner store. Originally kiosks would only allow access to keys via a finger print scan. Keys can also be delivered by mail.

Some commentators have mentioned concerns that the app could potentially allow people to copy keys other than their own, since only a few seconds of physical access to a key is required to scan it. The number of KeyMe kiosks in 2016 was about two hundred, which had fabricated about one million keys at that time, and by 2020 the company had over 4,000 kiosks in retailers such as Kroger, Ikea, and Rite-Aid.

In 2021, a jury in Marshall, Texas unanimously concluded that KeyMe did not infringe any patent claims of The Hillman Group, which had sued KeyMe in the United States District Court for the Eastern District of Texas. US District Judge James Rodney Gilstrap presided over the trial.

Funding
KeyMe Locksmiths raised $300K in angel funding from Ravin Gandhi in 2012. KeyMe raised $2.3 million in seed funding in 2013 from Battery Ventures and then another $7.8 million in its Series A funding round in 2014. In 2016 the company received $20 million in Series B venture financing, a round led by Comcast Ventures and including investors 7-Eleven and Ravin Gandhi. The company then raised $15 million in their Series C round and $25 million in their Series D round. The company received $50 million in further funding in 2019 and $35 million in 2020.

References

2012 establishments